Literalism may refer to:

Biblical literalism, a term used differently by different authors concerning biblical interpretation
Qur'anic literalism, see Bi-la kaifa
The principle of aiming at a literal translation
Literalism (music), a late-20th century method of composing music using physical representations of elements of musical composition to create everything from classical orchestral pieces to apparently formless moments of noise

See also
Literal (disambiguation)